Shah Vali (also Romanized as Shāh Valī; also known as Shāh Valī-ye Soflá) is a village in Jaffal Rural District, in the Central District of Shadegan County, Khuzestan Province, Iran. At the 2006 census, its population was 1,114, in 195 families.

References 

Populated places in Shadegan County